Amudhae is a 2005 Indian Tamil-language romantic drama film directed by Ezhil, starring Jai Akash, Prakash Raj, Madhumitha, and Uma.

Premise 

Nancy, who is in love with Dinakar, gets married to millionaire Victor. Dinakar later gets married to his cousin, Vinaya. How Nancy reunites with Dinakar forms the rest of the story.

Cast 

Jai Akash as Dinakar
Prakash Raj as Victor
Madhumitha as Nancy
Uma as Vinaya
Ranjitha as Susi (special appearance)
Ragasya (special appearance in the song "Pottu Thaluda")
Anamika (special appearance in the song "Valayal")
Dhamu as Dinakar's friend
Delhi Ganesh as Dinakar's father
M. S. Bhaskar as Victor's friend
Santhana Bharathi as Nancy's father
Sathyapriya as Dinakar's mother
Fathima Babu as Nancy's mother
Kuyili as Vinaya's mother
Rajasekar as the church father
Swaminathan as a priest
 Bava Lakshmanan as the village head
Krishnamoorthy as an alcoholic

Production 
After Ezhil saw a special screening of Ramakrishna, he signed Jai Akash for his next film Amudhae. The film was to be produced by a thirty five person unit, which later became a twenty eight person unit.  Madhumitha was cast as the heroine. The film was shot in several locations in Kerala including Alappuzha, Munnar, Kuttanad, Chalakudy and Vazhachal.

Soundtrack 
Newcomer Sunil Xavier, who worked as an assistant to S. A. Rajkumar, composed the music for the film.

"Anbe Adu Oru Kalam" – Unni Menon, Sujatha
"Enna Enna Nan Solla" – Swarnalatha
"Madura Jilla" – Manikka Vinayagam, Priya
"Pottu Thalluda" – Krishnaraj
"Valaya Kadu" – Karthik, Subha

Release and reception 
A critic from Sify opined that "The film lacks technical finesse and offers little in the way of surprise", praised the performances of Raj, Madhumitha, and Uma while criticising Jai Akash's "wooden", emotionless performance. Malathi Rangarajan of The Hindu opined that "Flashes of brilliance and food for thought the story offers — you could disagree with the logic or feasibility of the proposition tabled, but the point is, it is something different". Malini Mannath of Chennai Online wrote that "If he [Ezhil] had worked on the screenplay better, etched his characters in a more convincing way, and had a tighter grip on his narration, it would have turned out to be a more engaging entertainer". Kalki called the film "above average".

References

External links 

2000s Tamil-language films
2005 romantic drama films
Films directed by Ezhil
Indian romantic drama films